Bicyclus funebris, the funereal bush brown, is a butterfly in the family Nymphalidae. It is found in Senegal, the Gambia, Guinea-Bissau, Guinea, Sierra Leone, Liberia, Ivory Coast, Ghana, Togo, Benin, Nigeria, Cameroon, Gabon, the Republic of the Congo, Angola, the Central African Republic, the Democratic Republic of the Congo, Uganda, western Kenya, western Tanzania and northern Zambia. The habitat consists of drier forests, but extends to wet forests and dense savanna. It is also found in heavy woodland.

The larvae feed on Setaria barbata, Digitaria seminuda and Imperata cylindrica.

References

Elymniini
Butterflies described in 1844